Thomas Eli Evans (February 1896 – after 1926) was an English professional footballer who played in the Football League for Birmingham and Brighton & Hove Albion.

Evans was born in Dudley, which is now in the West Midlands county. He played local football before joining Birmingham during the First World War. When the Football League resumed, Evans made his debut in the Second Division on 27 September 1919, standing in for Joe Roulson at right half in a home game against Huddersfield Town which Birmingham won 4–2. He played five more games during the 1919–20 season, in each case taking Roulson's place at right half either in his absence or while he switched to the left to replace Percy Barton. Unable to establish himself as a first-team player, Evans spent the 1921–22 season in the Third Division South with Brighton & Hove Albion, but played only five matches when regular right half Jack Woodhouse was unavailable through injury. He then returned to the Black Country where he played for several years in the Birmingham & District League for Cradley Heath.

References

1896 births
Year of death missing
Sportspeople from Dudley
English footballers
Association football wing halves
Cradley Heath F.C. players
Birmingham City F.C. players
Brighton & Hove Albion F.C. players
English Football League players